Yekora is a Papuan language spoken in Morobe Province, Papua New Guinea. It is part of the Binandere family of the Trans–New Guinea phylum of languages, and is close particularly close to Zia.

References 

Languages of Morobe Province
Greater Binanderean languages